Nil (stylized as nil) is a Japanese rock band formed in 1998 by Tetsu Takano (ex-Malice Mizer, ex-Mega8Ball, Zigzo, The JuneJulyAugust), Hiroyuki Kashimoto and Kyoshi Moro. The original intent of Nil was to become Tetsu's solo unit and even though it has become a full-fledged band, all lyrics and songwriting has been solely handled by Tetsu. The band only lasted briefly during its first incarnation and went on hiatus by the end of 1998. It would not resurface until the middle of 2002 when they would start recording again and Tetsu formed his own record label, Afro Skull Records. The name "Nil" literally means "absolute zero" and as an acronym refers to "native irreligious language".

In 2005, Nil had many setbacks which resulted in the departure of founding members Kashimoto and Moro who both left the band on January 10, 2005, the last day of the "Touring Inferno" tour. Eventually replacement drummer Furuton (ex-Oblivion Dust, ex-Mega8Ball support) left the band after only 6 months. By the end of 2005 Nil finally settled down with the addition of Masaru Kobayashi (ex-Soy Sauce Sonix, ex-Sads, The Cro-Magnons) on bass and Kazama Hiroyuki (ex-Fantastic Designs) on drums.

In the years since resuming activities, Nil has recorded and released 5 full albums, 7 mini albums, 1 cover album, 1 live album, 1 compilation album, 3 singles, 2 fan-club only CDs and 8 DVDs. Tetsu has claimed that Nil is his life's work and despite some bumps in the road he has showed no signs of slowing down with his music and the band Nil.

Members 
 Tetsu Takano (ex-Ner-vous, ex-Malice Mizer, ex-Mega8Ball, ex-Zigzo, The JuneJulyAugust, The Black Comet Club Band) – vocals, guitar, songwriter, leader (1998, 2002–present)
 Masaru Kobayashi (ex-Soy Sauce Sonix, ex-Sads, The Cro-Magnons, The Black Comet Club Band) – bass (2005–present)
 Hiroyuki Kazama (ex-Fantastic Designs, The Black Comet Club Band) – drums (2005–present)

Former 
 Hiroyuki "Marawo" Kashimoto – bass (1998, 2002–2005)
 Kyoshi Moro (ex-Ner-vous, Mugiwara Boushi) – drums (1998, 2002–2005)
 Sota "Furuton" Ofuruton (ex-Oblivion Dust, ex-Mega8Ball support) – drums (2005)

Discography

Albums 
 12Inplosion (May 8, 2004), Oricon Albums Chart Peak Position: No. 161
 The song "Hate Beat!" was used as the ending theme of the TV program Quiz! Hexagon.
 Excalibur (エクスカリバー, April 6, 2005) No. 184
 The Painkiller (January 24, 2007) No. 179
 The Great Spirits (March 19, 2008, compilation album) No. 211
 Multiness (マルチネス, September 10, 2008) No. 176
 Scotoma (September 16, 2009) No. 198
 Granvia (September 03, 2014) No. 161

Mini albums 
 Nil from Hell (September 1, 2002)
 Sayonara da Vinci (さよならダヴィンチ, December 1, 2002)
 Down to Dawn (September 18, 2003)
 The Covering Inferno (November 25, 2004, cover album) No. 220
 Agape (アガペー, November 2, 2005, limited edition EP available only at live appearances or by mail-order)
 Scherzo (スケルツオ, November 2, 2005) No. 259
 Man Woman (マンウーマン, October 25, 2006) No. 234
 Guitar and Skirt (ギタートスカート, November 22, 2006) No. 274
 Aria (December 13, 2006) No. 296
 Geron (ゲロン, September 12, 2007) No. 210
 Warp Rock (September 8, 2010) No. 223

Singles 
 "Drop" (March 16, 2005), Oricon Singles Chart Peak Position: No. 121
 "Gita to Sukato" (ギタートスカート, November 22, 2006)
 "Aria" (December 13, 2006)

Live album 
 Stroke! Swing!! Shout!!! (January 10, 2005)

Fan-club only CDs 
 Thank You (July 2004)
 One Day Ver. DS Mix (November 2005)
 Thank You Rerecording (2010)

Compilations 
 Search Out the Jams: The Pogo Tribute Album (October 8, 2008)
 Contributed a cover of the song "1990 (Machiwabita Toki)" (1990(待ちわびた時))

DVDs 
 Stronger Than Paranoid (July 2004, PV collection)
 Tears for Killers (March 4, 2006, limited edition collection of PVs available only at live appearances or by mail-order)
 The Pirates (February 2007)
 Tonight! Revolution! (March 24, 2007, live concert)
 MultinessSpecial (April 11, 2009, live concert)
 Sco-Tomato (September 13, 2009)
 "W.H.M" (January 1, 2010, live concert)
 The Warp Rock Studio (September 20, 2010, PV collection)

References

External links 
 Official website
 Official MySpace
 Kyoshi Moro's official website
 Hiroyuki Kashimoto's blog

Japanese alternative rock groups
Musical groups from Tokyo
Musical groups established in 1998
Musical groups disestablished in 1998
Musical groups reestablished in 2002
Japanese musical trios